Hot Country Songs is a chart that ranks the top-performing country music songs in the United States, published by Billboard magazine.  In 1995, 29 different songs topped the chart, then published under the title Hot Country Singles & Tracks, in 52 issues of the magazine, based on weekly airplay data from country music radio stations compiled by Nielsen Broadcast Data Systems.

At the start of the year, the song at number one was "Pickup Man" by Joe Diffie, which had been in the top spot since the issue dated December 17, 1994.  Alan Jackson was the only artist to achieve three number ones in 1995, topping the chart with "Gone Country", "I Don't Even Know Your Name" and "Tall, Tall Trees".  Tim McGraw had the longest unbroken run in the top spot, spending five weeks at number one with "I Like It, I Love It", and the total of seven weeks which he spent at number one with that song and "Not a Moment Too Soon" was the highest by any artist.  Brooks & Dunn, George Strait and John Michael Montgomery were the only other artists to achieve more than one number one in 1995.

Acts to achieve their first number one during the year included Bryan White with "Someone Else's Star", Jeff Carson with "Not on Your Love", Pam Tillis with "Mi Vida Loca (My Crazy Life)", Ty Herndon with "What Mattered Most", David Lee Murphy with "Dust on the Bottle", and Wade Hayes with "Old Enough to Know Better".  Additionally, Canadian singer Shania Twain made her first appearance at number one in July with "Any Man of Mine".  She would go on achieve stardom in both the country and pop markets, and become one of the most globally successful recording artists of the 1990s.  The final number one of the year was "That's as Close as I'll Get to Loving You" by Aaron Tippin.

Chart history

See also
1995 in music
List of artists who reached number one on the U.S. country chart

References

1995
1995 record charts
Country